Télévision Par Satellite (TPS) was a French company that offered subscription television packages via satellite.

It was created in 1996 by Eutelsat and Arte, soon joined by the TF1 Group, the M6 Group, France Télévisions, RTL Group, France Telecom and Suez Environnement. France Télévisions left the company in 2002.

TPS offered various channels, including some owned by themselves:
TPS Star, the general entertainment flagship channel
TPS Foot, a football channel
Multivision, a 7-channel premium PPV service
And several movie channels: TPS Cineclub, TPS CinéComedy, TPS Cinéculte, TPS Cinextrême, TPS Cinéfamily, TPS Cinéstar, TPS Cinétoile and TPS Homecinéma.

In November 2005, it was announced that TPS would merge with its competitor CanalSat, owned by the Canal+ Group.

The two distributors merged their packages on March 21, 2007. Essentially, TPS merged into CanalSat which was then branded as Nouveau CanalSat. All the TPS branded movie channels were merged into the Canal+-owned CinéCinéma package, TPS Star and TPS Foot would be the only channels that still used the TPS brand. Some new channels launched on both platforms. Eventually, the TPS service from the Hot Bird satellites will close down and the former TPS customers will have to change their equipment to receive the CanalSat service from the Astra satellites instead.

External links
SES guide to receiving Astra satellites
SES guide to channels broadcasting on Astra satellites

Direct broadcast satellite services
Television in France
1996 establishments in France
2007 disestablishments in France
2007 mergers and acquisitions

nl:TPS